James Beckwith may refer to:

 James Carroll Beckwith (1852–1917), American painter
 James R. Beckwith (1857–1935), Wisconsin politician
 James Beckwith (musician), British musician